Thoracochromis is a fish genus of haplochromine cichlids that are endemic to Africa. Most species are from rivers in Angola and Namibia, or the Congo River Basin in Central Africa, but T. wingatii is from the Nile system. Additionally, there are a few apparently undescribed species from the Nile system (two in its delta and one from lakes near Fayum), which appear to be close relatives of T. wingatii or Haplochromis loati. Many species have been moved between this genus and Haplochromis, and while some consensus has been reached in recent years, their mutual delimitation is still far from settled.

Species
There are currently 12 recognized species in this genus:

 Thoracochromis albolabris (Trewavas & Thys van den Audenaerde, 1969) (Thicklipped Happy)
 Thoracochromis bakongo (Thys van den Audenaerde, 1964)
 Thoracochromis brauschi (Poll & Thys van den Audenaerde, 1965)
 Thoracochromis buysi (M. L. Penrith, 1970) (Namib Happy)
 Thoracochromis callichromus (Poll, 1948)
 Thoracochromis demeusii (Boulenger, 1899)
 Thoracochromis fasciatus (Perugia, 1892)
 Thoracochromis lucullae (Boulenger, 1913)
 Thoracochromis moeruensis (Boulenger, 1899)
 Thoracochromis schwetzi (Poll, 1967)
 Thoracochromis stigmatogenys (Boulenger, 1913)
 Thoracochromis wingatii (Boulenger, 1902)

Distribution
T.buysi is endemic to the Kunene River.

References

 
Cichlid fish of Africa
Cichlid genera
Taxa named by Humphry Greenwood